The Kigosi National Park  is a portected area in located Shinyanga Region, Geita Region and northwest Tabora Region of Tanzania. In 2019, Kigosi National Park was created. It has an area of 8265 km2 and is a part of the largest wetlands complex in East Africa, the Moyowosi/Malagarasi wetlands complex. The Malagarasi, Moyowosi, Nikonga, Ugalla, Kigosi, Nikonga, and Gombe (not to be confused with the Gombe Stream where the chimpanzees dwell) are seven slow-moving rivers that wind their ways through a large and intricate network of marshes, plains lakes, and woodlands. In the end, these rivers merge to form the Malagarasi River, which flows into Lake Tanganyika in Ilagala. The system as a whole is larger than the entirety of Portugal at around 92,000 square kilometers.

History
Formerly Kigosi Game Reserve, the protected area was first established in 1983. It'status was upgraded to National park in 2019.
It encompasses an area of 8265 km.

Geography
The reserve extends from Bukombe and Kahama Districts in Shinyanga Region up to Urambo District in Tabora Region. There are two annual rainfall peaks, in February and November. The dry season starts in mid May and ends in mid October.  Annual rainfall varies between 1,000m and 1,500m. It is one of the largest reserves in East Africa with floodplain and wetland ecosystems. This reserve is an important wild animal protection and feeding area during the dry season for migratory animals like waterfowl and large mammal species. The maximum temperature of the area is 29°C.

It is thought to provide close to 30% of Lake Tanganyika's freshwater. The entire region has been declared as a Ramsar site, a wetland of worldwide significance. Kigosi National Park is located in the northeast of the complex, where the Nikonga River joins the Moyowosi wetlands complex and drains the shallow, sloping Miombo woods.

Fauna
The shoebill stork, a rare and slightly ominous bird, as well as the towering and graceful wattled crane have their biggest concentrations in Africa there. The largest flocks of pygmy geese in Africa are present. The largest concentrations of Cape clawless otters in Africa can be found in the Moyowosi wetlands. Lion, leopard, buffalo, crocodile, topi, sitatunga, warthog, baboon, zebra, sable, roan, eland, bushbuck, oribi, common and Bohor reedbuck, hyena, hippo, and Defassa waterbuck are just a few examples of the abundant big game. The landscape is interesting. Miombo woodlands surround vast lakes and marshes, many of which have floating palm and papyrus islands, and grassy flood plains dotted with palm trees.

The lion populations in western Tanzania are well-known, and Kigosi is no exception. The Miombo forests are home to big game in addition to lions. Numerous buffalo, sable, roan, kudu, leopards, and topis are present. Sightings of the elusive, water-loving sitatunga in the south's swamps. For the sitatunga, this is one of the biggest protected areas in East Africa. Waterbuck, hippo, and crocodiles have the ideal habitat in the wet areas. The marshes are also the ideal habitat for rare water birds, such as the great snipe, wattled cranes, and shoebills.

References

Protected areas of Tanzania
Protected areas established in 1983
1983 establishments in Tanzania
Important Bird Areas of Tanzania